Wirówek may refer to the following places:
Wirówek, Gmina Bojadła in Lubusz Voivodeship (west Poland)
Wirówek, Gmina Świdnica in Lubusz Voivodeship (west Poland)
Wirówek, Masovian Voivodeship (east-central Poland)
Wirówek, West Pomeranian Voivodeship (north-west Poland)